The Hall of State (originally the State of Texas Building) is a building in Dallas's Fair Park that commemorates the history of the U.S. state of Texas and is considered one of the best examples of Art Deco architecture in the state.  It was designed and built for the Texas Centennial Exposition.

History
Built in 1936 at the astronomical (especially during the Great Depression) price of $1.2 million, the building was the most expensive per unit area of any structure built in Texas. It was designed for the centennial of the Republic of Texas by architect Donald Barthelme in the beaux arts style and is considered one of the most representative examples of art deco architecture in Texas. According to documents from the Dallas Historical Society Centennial archives collection, John F. Livers designed and manufactured the majority of the Art Deco ornamental metalwork at his Livers Lighting and Bronze Company in Kansas City, Missouri, including the light fixtures. It was built using Texas limestone and features memorials to many of the heroes of Texas history.

Current
The Dallas Historical Society has been responsible for managing the Hall of State since 1938.  The Hall of State is listed on the National Register of Historic Places as a part of Fair Park. In 1986, the building was restored at a cost of approximately $1.5 million, and the G.B. Dealey Library was opened.

The G.B. Dealey Library, located in the East Texas room of the Hall of State, holds more than ten thousand bound volumes and three million historic documents, including Sam Houston's handwritten account of the battle of San Jacinto.

The Dallas Historical Society rents the Hall of State for events and provides guided tours to school groups.

The structure became a Recorded Texas Historic Landmark in 1981.

The American Museum of the Miniature Arts is currently located at the Hall of State.

Architecture

In the center, above the entrance is an  bronze with gold leaf statue by Allie Tennant of the "Tejas Warrior": an archer holds high a bow without an arrow, meant to symbolize peace.

Inside the Hall of State is the Hall of Heroes, which features six bronze statues of James Fannin, Mirabeau B. Lamar, Stephen F. Austin, Sam Houston, Thomas Jefferson Rusk and William B. Travis.  There are also bronze plaques that commemorate the Battle of the Alamo and the Battle of San Jacinto.  Outside, a statue of Robert L. Thornton, benefactor of the State Fair of Texas and former Mayor of Dallas stands, overlooking the esplanade.

On the exterior frieze, the Hall of State commemorates 60 prominent historical figures in Texas' history:

 Edward Burleson
 Branch Tanner Archer
 Thomas Jefferson Rusk
 William B. Travis
 James Stephen Hogg
 Richard Ellis
 Mirabeau B. Lamar
 Ben Milam
 David G. Burnet
 John Coffee "Jack" Hays
 James Smith (Texas General)
 Albert Sidney Johnston
 Stephen F. Austin
 James Bonham
 Davy Crockett
 Sam Houston
 J. Pinckney Henderson
 Oran M. Roberts
 Lorenzo de Zavala
 James Bowie
 John Reagan
 Anson Jones
 James Fannin
 Gail Borden
 William H. Wharton
 Peter Bell
 José Antonio Navarro
 Elisha M. Pease
 Samuel May Williams
 Ben McCulloch
 James W. Robinson
 Matthew Caldwell
 James Collinsworth
 John Hemphill
 George Childress
 Thomas Green
 R.T. Wheeler
 William B. Franklin
 Henry Wax Karnes
 Moseley Baker
 Walter P. Lane
 Patrick Churchill Jack
 Francisco Vásquez de Coronado
 Alonso Alvarez de Pineda
 Alonso de León
 Alvar Nuñez Cabeza de Vaca
 Hamilton Prieleaux Bee
 William Read Scurry
 Memucan Hunt Jr
 Frank Johnson
 Samuel Price Carson
 Sidney Sherman
 Abner Smith Lipscomb
 George Washington Hockley
 Henry Weidner Baylor
 Robert McAlpin Williamson
 Menefee (either William Menefee or John Menefee)
 Thomas Jefferson Chambers
 Isaac Van Zandt
 Thomas S. Lubbock

See also

National Register of Historic Places listings in Dallas County, Texas
Recorded Texas Historic Landmarks in Dallas County
List of Dallas Landmarks

References

External links

The Hall of State at Fair Park
Hall of State Tour

Fair Park
Landmarks in Dallas
Art Deco architecture in Texas
Buildings and structures completed in 1936
Recorded Texas Historic Landmarks
Museums in Dallas
World's fair architecture in Texas